The Hollywood Theatre is a historic movie theater in northeast Portland, Oregon, owned by a non-profit organization. It is the central historical point of the Hollywood District. The Theatre is located at 4122 NE Sandy Blvd, across the street from the first suburban Fred Meyer store, which is currently occupied by Rite Aid. The Hollywood Theatre was placed on the National Register of Historic Places in 1983 and is considered to be a gem of Northeast Portland's historic culture and tradition.

Commissioned by Jensen and Herberg, architects John Virginius Bennes and Harry A. Herzog designed the building in multiple styles including Spanish Colonial (exterior) and after the Baths of Caracalla and Bernini (interior). The theater opened on Saturday, July 17, 1926, with 1,491 seats, as a venue for vaudeville and silent movies. It became a Cinerama theater in 1961, utilizing the ultra-widescreen process until 1963. It was still labelled a "Cinerama theater" until 1969, running exclusively 70-millimeter films. On June 13, 1968, Stanley Kubrick's 2001: A Space Odyssey opened, and ran for over 10 months.

In 1975, the theater was divided into three auditoriums, and ran second run films throughout the '80s and '90s.

The theater became a non-profit in 1997. Starting in 2011, major renovations were done, including new seats, screens, sound systems and an updated paint job. In 2013, a Kickstarter campaign raised the funds necessary to erect a new marquee, and in 2015, 70-millimeter capability was re-installed.

The Hollywood Theatre currently screens first run films; along with a wide range of both well known and obscure classic cinema, offbeat exploitation, educational, independent and experimental films; with a focus of screening repertory films on 35-millimeter and 70-millimeter. The theater also has hosted many special guests since 2015, including Quentin Tarantino, Pam Grier, Michael Ironside, Piper Laurie and Joe Dante. The main auditorium has a 50-foot screen and 384 seats, while two smaller auditoriums are located upstairs, each seating 111.

The theater is self-owned and operated by a non-profit organization of the same name. Its mission is to preserve and maintain the historic theater and use it to present a diverse program of films.

Airport theater
In December 2015, Hollywood Theatre announced plans to open an annex theater in Portland International Airport. The theater will seat 18 with standing room for 10 to 20 people and also have space for live performances. The theatre will show short films no longer than 20 minutes and be free of charge. In mid-February 2017, it was reported that the airport "microcinema" would open on February 23 and have seating for 17 people.

Movie Madness
In 2017, the Hollywood Theatre purchased the iconic Portland video store Movie Madness, and its collection of over 90,000 movies.

Gallery

References

External links

 
 News Reel of Hollywood Theatre
 

1926 establishments in Oregon
Cinemas and movie theaters in Oregon
Hollywood, Portland, Oregon
National Register of Historic Places in Portland, Oregon
Theatres completed in 1926
Theatres in Portland, Oregon
Theatres on the National Register of Historic Places in Oregon
Portland Historic Landmarks